Digitorum muscle may refer to:

In the upper extremities:
 Extensor digitorum muscle
 Flexor digitorum profundus muscle
 Flexor digitorum superficialis muscle

In the lower extremities:
 Extensor digitorum brevis muscle
 Extensor digitorum longus muscle
 Flexor digitorum brevis muscle
 Flexor digitorum longus muscle